The Roman Forum of Lahnau-Waldgirmes is a fortified Roman trading place, located at the edge of the modern village Waldgirmes, part of Lahnau on the Lahn, Hesse, Germany. The site has the oldest known stone buildings in Magna Germania.

The archaeological evidence at Waldgirmes suggests the remains of one of a series of planned towns and market places founded by the Romans east of the Rhine and north of the Danube, with the aim of long-term growth into population centres. The complex was never completed. In the absence of any historical reference or local inscriptions, the original name of the site remains unknown.

History 

Since Theodor Mommsen, it had been assumed that Roman operations in Greater Germania were limited to exploratory expeditions, and small temporary trading stations. This was despite Cassius Dio's (56,18,2) reference to the foundation of some cities during the governorship of Varus. 
 
Waldgirmes appears to have been one such place, designed to trade with the Germanic population and to supply Roman troops. The Celtic oppidum of "Dünsberg", abandoned around 20 BC, was about 20 km from the new site.
 
Waldgirmes appears to have been a planned new foundation on a virgin site. Dendrochronological study of the wooden wall indicates that the trees providing the wood was felled around 4 BC. Thus, the settlement's construction probably started before that time. Its location, on a spur of land jutting into the Lahn river, was highly defensible. 
 
Additionally, it would have been possible to reach areas of established Roman presence along the Rhine (like Colonia Claudia Ara Agrippinensium and Castra Vetera) relatively quickly by boat.
 

The existence of the oversized forum at the centre of the site suggests that it may have been intended to form the core settlement of a future civitas, an important part of a projected Romanisation of the area. It is possible that Waldgimes was going to be a colonia for legio veterans, because no barracks and no military equipment have been found in the recent excavations
 
The site remained unfinished, indicated by the large undeveloped areas. Following the battle of the Teutoburg Forest, when virtually all Roman military posts east of the Rhine were lost, Waldgirmes was abandoned. The finds suggest that this was intentional: between 9 and 16 AD, during the period of Roman punitive expeditions, the site was occasionally used as a military camp. After that, it was destroyed by the Roman army.

A Romano-German city?
 

 

The site has the oldest known stone buildings in Magna Germania.
 
The archaeological evidence at Waldgirmes suggests the remains of one of a series of planned towns and market places founded by the Romans east of the Rhine and north of the Danube, with the aim of long-term growth into population centers of the newly created province of Germania. 
 
The complex was never completed. In the absence of any historical reference or local inscriptions, the original name of the site remains unknown.

Archaeological evidence and finds 

The area, just northwest of Waldgirmes and at the eastern city limit of Wetzlar, has been the subject of archaeological excavation since 1993. The remains discovered include an impressive forum, on one side of which stood a stone-built central building or basilica, flanked by two apses, Further structures were built using the Roman half-timbered technique on stone foundations. Their roofs were of wooden slates.

The complex was surrounded by a wooden palisade with a double ditch and three gates to the west, east and south. The location of what would have been the northern gate was taken by a tower. From the outside, it would have looked like a Roman military fort, but its interior contained a trading centre with a market, two crossing streets with central channels for drainage or water supplies, stables, storage buildings, taverns and houses with wooden porticos. By 2004, 24 house floorplans and a well of 4 m depth had been excavated. No temple has been discovered, a fact that may be explained by the short duration of activity at the site. Everything found resembles a higher-status Roman settlement; nothing is reminiscent of Germanic or Celtic traditions.

One of the most important finds is 200 fragments of a life-sized gilded bronze equestrian statue, probably of Augustus, discovered in and around the central building and surrounding settlement. Other important finds include a glass seal with a depiction of Niobe, a mosaic glass bead depicting Apis, several other pieces of jewellery, and some unworked amber. The pottery found was predominantly Roman, simple handmade Germanic material made up only about 20% of the total ceramics.  Apparently, different ethnic groups inhabited the site side by side. Coins found date activity at Waldgirmes to between 5 BC and 9 AD, the year of the Battle of Teutoburg Forest.

History 
Since Theodor Mommsen, it had been assumed that Roman operations in Greater Germania were limited to exploratory expeditions, and small temporary trading stations. This was despite Cassius Dio's (56,18,2) reference to the foundation of some cities during the governorship of Varus. Waldgirmes appears to have been one such place, designed to trade with the Germanic population and to supply Roman troops. The Celtic oppidum of Dünsberg, abandoned around 20 BC, was about 20 km from the new site.

Waldgirmes appears to have been a planned new foundation on a virgin site. Dendrochronological study of the wooden well indicates that the tree providing the wood was felled in 4 BC. Thus, the settlement's construction probably started before that time. Its location, on a spur of land jutting into the Lahn river, was highly defensible. Additionally, it would have been possible to reach areas of established Roman presence along the Rhine relatively quickly by boat. The existence of the oversized forum at the centre of the site suggests that it may have been intended to form the core settlement of a future civitas, an important part of a projected Romanisation of the area.

The site remained unfinished, indicated by the large undeveloped areas. Following the battle of the Teutoburg Forest, when virtually all Roman military posts east of the Rhine were lost, Waldgirmes was abandoned. The finds suggest that this was intentional: between AD 9 and 16, during the period of Roman punitive expeditions, the site was occasionally used as a military camp. After that, it was destroyed by the Roman army.

Notes

Bibliography
 Armin Becker, Gabriele Rasbach: „Städte in Germanien“: Der Fundplatz Waldgirmes. In: Rainer Wiegels (ed.): Die Varusschlacht. Wendepunkt der Geschichte?. Theiss, Stuttgart 2007 (Archäologie in Deutschland, Sonderheft), S. 102–116.
 Gabriele Rasbach, Armin Becker: Die spätaugusteische Stadtgründung in Lahnau-Waldgirmes. Archäologische, architektonische und naturwissenschaftliche Untersuchungen. In: Germania 81 (2003), S. 147–199.
 Michael Zick: Rom an der Lahn. In: Abenteuer Archäologie 2006, 1, S. 46ff.   (online)

External links
 Römisches Forum Lahnau-Waldgirmes German-language page about the site 
 German Archaeological Institute report on Waldgirmes
 Livius.org: Waldgirmes - pictures

Archaeology of Germany
Buildings and structures in Lahn-Dill-Kreis
Roman towns and cities in Germany
Tourist attractions in Hesse
Germania
Roman towns in Germania